
The 23 was a bus service which ran from Stirling to St Andrews.

History

Operation
The route dated back to the 1930s, at which time it was numbered 298 and operated by W. Alexander & Sons between Buchanan bus station, Glasgow, and St Andrews. The service was later renumbered as 23. After the company was split in 1961 by its parent, the Scottish Bus Group, the service was operated by Alexander (Midland) and Alexander (Fife). In 1981, the route was shortened, with its eastern terminus now at Stirling. However, some Glasgow to St Andrews journeys continued to operate on Friday and Saturday evenings primarily for the benefit of university students. Through privatisation of British bus services and subsequent ownership changes, the route was acquired by Fife Scottish, part of the Stagecoach group.

Decline and withdrawal
Service levels were progressively reduced, with Stagecoach citing a "decrease in demand". In 2017 only three return journeys ran per day. The number 23 bus was withdrawn completely in 2020. Stagecoach stated that it had been underperforming prior to the COVID-19 pandemic and that it was operating at "a significant loss". The withdrawal drew criticism from local MSPs.

Aftermath
On 14 September 2020, First Scotland East introduced a new service numbered X53 which operates on the same route as the number 23, between Stirling and Kinross. It serves areas, notably Muckhart, that would otherwise have no bus service. Residents in Gateside have complained about the loss of bus services to St Andrews.

Alternative services
Today, the X24 service from Glasgow to St Andrews is significantly quicker than the number 23. However, it does not travel via Stirling or Kinross.

References

Bus routes in Scotland
Transport in Glasgow